Ramsey is a commuter rail station along the Northstar Line in Ramsey, Minnesota, approximately 35 minutes from downtown Minneapolis. It is the first infill station on the route, fitting between stations in Elk River and Anoka. Those stations opened when Northstar began service on November 16, 2009, while Ramsey opened just over three years later on November 14, 2012. The station is located next to Ramsey's city hall at The COR (formerly known as Ramsey Town Center), a transit-oriented development next to the line. Construction on the station began on March 27, 2012, and was completed on November 8; the station was opened on November 14. The commuter rail service replaced the Ramsey Star Express commuter bus (route 856) that connected the city to Minneapolis.

References

External links
 
 Metro Transit: Ramsey Station

Northstar Line stations
Railway stations in the United States opened in 2012
Railway stations in Anoka County, Minnesota
2012 establishments in Minnesota